Samastipur Law College or Vidhi Mahavidyalaya is a Government Law school situated at Uttarayan, Kasipur in Samastipur in the Indian state of Bihar. It offers 3 years integrated LL.B. course which is approved by Bar Council of India (BCI), New Delhi and affiliated to Lalit Narayan Mithila University. Samastipur Law College was established in 1978.

References

Law schools in Bihar
Universities and colleges in Bihar
Educational institutions established in 1978
1978 establishments in Bihar